Kitselas Canyon, also Kitsalas Canyon is a stretch of the Skeena River in northwestern British Columbia, Canada, between the community of Usk and the Tsimshian community of Kitselas.  It was a major obstacle to steamboat travel on the Skeena River.

The canyon is a National Historic Site of Canada.

People of the Canyon

"Kitselas" or "Gitselasu" means "People of the Canyon". The Kitselas have lived and lived in the canyon for the past 5,000 years. Kitselas is only one of fourteen tribes in the Tsimshian Nation. Tsimshian means "in the entrance to the Ksian". The traditional language of the Tsimshian people is Sm’algyax. There are four main clans in the Tsimshian Nation, the Ghanada (Raven), Gispwuda (Killer whale/ Sea Bear/ Black Fish), Lax’sgiik (Eagle), and the LaxGibu (Wolf). The Killer Whale and the Eagle and the Raven clans lived in the Canyon.

There are five main village sites in the canyon. The first established village was the village of Tsunyow which means "The Landing place". The second established village was Gitaus which means "people of the sand bar" in the middle of the canyon is Gitlaxdzawk which has two meanings "People of the Fortress" and "People of the place where they steal canoe bottomboards" or " People of the place of Feasts".  And the Paul Mason site, sadly there is no recorded history to this site. The Wolves lived in the LaxGyels area (Lakelse Lake) and Klew’nu (Usk).

Houses

The following are houses listed by Wilfred Bennett Sr.
 
House of Gagawtsgan- Laxsgiik (Eagle Clan)
House of Gitxon- Laxsgiik (Eagle Clan)
House of Iyuus- Laxgiik (Eagle Clan)
House of Nisgitlope-Laxgiik (Eagle Clan)
House of  Nis’Hawas- Laxgiik (Eagle Clan)
House of Nis’Nagwalk- Laxgiik (Eagle Clan)
House of Gwam(K’oom)- Ganhada (Raven Clan)
House of Sats’an- Ganhada (Raven Clan)
House of Nis’Taxook- Gispwuda (Killer Whale Clan)
House of Hais- Gispwuda (Killer Whale clan)
House of Lax'tiil- LaxGibu (Wolf Clan)
House of Stee'How- LaxGibu (Wolf Clan)

See also
Kitselas

References

Canyons and gorges of British Columbia
Skeena Country
Heritage sites in British Columbia
National Historic Sites in British Columbia